Zheng Jie was the defending champion, but chose not to participate this year.

Gréta Arn won the title, defeating Victoria Azarenka 2–6, 6–1, 7–6(7-3) in the final.

Seeds

Draw

Finals

Top half

Bottom half

References

External links
 http://itftennis.com/procircuit/tournaments/women's-tournament/info.aspx?tournamentid=1100015864

Portugal Open
Estoril Open
Estoril Open